AJ Gilbert (born 19 June 1987 in Dorrigo, Australia) is an Australian rugby union player.

He played twice for the NSW Waratahs and competed for the Northern Suburbs Rugby Club in the Shute Shield.
He is of Filipino descent.

External links
Queensland player profile

Notes 

1987 births
Living people
Australian people of Filipino descent
Australian rugby union players
New South Wales Waratahs players
Queensland Reds players
Rugby union flankers
Rugby union players from New South Wales